The AfD Saxony-Anhalt is the state association of the Alternative for Germany (AfD) party in the state of Saxony-Anhalt. The state association is led by the member of parliament Martin Reichardt as state chairman. With André Poggenburg as the top candidate, the AfD Sachsen-Anhalt ran for the first time in a state election in 2016 and subsequently represented the second largest parliamentary group in the seventh state parliament of Saxony-Anhalt.

In January 2021, the State Office for the Protection of the Constitution in Saxony-Anhalt classified the state association as a suspected right-wing extremist.

Controversies 
The AfD parliamentary group in the state parliament of Saxony-Anhalt called for a demonstration in Magdeburg at the end of January 2022 against the CORONA protective measures. It remained unclear whether the AfD Saxony-Anhalt or the AfD parliamentary group organized and financed the demonstration. The faction receives state money and is therefore forbidden to finance political events.

AfD fraction in Landtag 
In the recent Landtag of Saxony-Anhalt the AfD fraction consist of 2 wemeon and 21 man:

Stategroup in Deutschen Bundestag

2021–2025

Reference

Alternative for Germany
Politics of Saxony-Anhalt
State sections of political parties in Germany